Los Llanos de Tormes is a municipality located in the province of Ávila, Castile and León, Spain. According to the Instituto Nacional de Estadística as of 2018 the municipality has a population of 64 inhabitants.

References

Municipalities in the Province of Ávila